Ebrahimabad-e Beyg Zadeh is a village in the Ardabil Province of Iran near the border with Azerbaijan.

References

Tageo

Populated places in Ardabil Province